The San Gregorio Fault is an active, 209 km (130 mi) long fault located off the coast of Northern California. The southern end of the fault is in southern Monterey Bay, and the northern end is about 20 km northwest of San Francisco, near Bolinas Bay, where the San Gregorio intersects the San Andreas Fault. Most of the San Gregorio fault trace is located offshore beneath the waters of Monterey Bay, Half Moon Bay, and the Pacific Ocean, though it cuts across land near Point Año Nuevo and Pillar Point. The San Gregorio Fault is part of a system of coastal faults which run roughly parallel to the San Andreas.

The movement of the San Gregorio is right-lateral strike-slip, and the slip rate is estimated to be 4–10 mm/year (0.2–0.4 inch/year). The most recent major earthquake along the fault had an estimated magnitude of 7 to 7.25 and occurred after 1270 AD—the earliest calibrated radiocarbon date for a native Californian cooking hearth at the Seal Cove site near Moss Beach that shows signs of displacement—but before 1775 when Spanish missionaries arrived in northern California and recorded history began for the region.

References 

Seismic faults of California
Geology of Marin County, California
Geology of Monterey County, California
Geology of San Francisco
Geology of San Mateo County, California
Geology of Santa Cruz County, California
Geography of the San Francisco Bay Area
Monterey Bay